The 2016 Foster Farms Bowl was an American college football bowl game played on December 28, 2016 at Levi's Stadium in Santa Clara, California. It was one of the 2016–17 bowl games concluding the 2016 FBS football season. The 15th edition of the Foster Farms Bowl, the game featured the Utah Utes from the Pac-12 Conference against the Indiana Hoosiers from the Big Ten Conference.

The 2016 edition was the first under its new management, as it is now run by the San Francisco 49ers NFL team.

Team selection
The game featured conference tie-ins with teams from the Pac-12 Conference and the Big Ten Conference.

Utah

The Utes finished their regular season 8-4 and accepted an invitation to play in the Foster Farms Bowl. This was Utah's second trip to the Foster Farms Bowl, with the previous appearance being during the 2005–06 bowl season when they won against Georgia Tech by a score of 38–10 in the 2005 Emerald Bowl.

Indiana

After finishing their season 6–6, the Hoosiers received an invitation to play in the Foster Farms Bowl, which they accepted. This bowl marked the Hoosiers' eleventh bowl game (they were 3–7 in bowl games previously) and they were seeking their first bowl victory since the 1991 Copper Bowl, when they shut out Baylor 24–0.

Game summary

Scoring summary

Statistics

Media 
The 2016 Foster Farms Bowl was the first broadcast under a new deal with Fox News.

Levi's Stadium was equipped for Intel freeD instant replay technology (previously used by CBS during Super Bowl 50 at the stadium earlier in the year) in order to facilitate testing for Be the Player – a new instant replay feature Fox planned to use during Super Bowl LI to present first-person perspectives of plays.

References

External links
 Game summary at ESPN

2016–17 NCAA football bowl games
2016
2016 Foster Farms Bowl
2016 Foster Farms Bowl
December 2016 sports events in the United States
2016 in sports in California